Copper(I) oxide or cuprous oxide is the inorganic compound with the formula Cu2O. It is one of the principal oxides of copper, the other being or copper(II) oxide or cupric oxide (CuO). Cuprous oxide is a  red-coloured solid and is a component of some antifouling paints.  The compound can appear either yellow or red, depending on the size of the particles. Copper(I) oxide is found as the reddish mineral cuprite.

Preparation
Copper(I) oxide may be produced by several methods.<ref>H. Wayne Richardson "Copper Compounds in Ullmann's Encyclopedia of Industrial Chemistry 2002, Wiley-VCH, Weinheim. </ref> Most straightforwardly, it arises via the oxidation of copper metal:
 4 Cu  +  O2   →  2 Cu2O
Additives such as water and acids affect the rate of this process as well as the further oxidation to copper(II) oxides. It is also produced commercially by reduction of copper(II) solutions with sulfur dioxide. 

 Reactions 
Aqueous cuprous chloride solutions react with base to give the same material.  In all cases, the color is highly sensitive to the procedural details.

Formation of copper(I) oxide is the basis of the Fehling's test and Benedict's test for reducing sugars. These sugars reduce an alkaline solution of a copper(II) salt, giving a bright red precipitate of Cu2O.

It forms on silver-plated copper parts exposed to moisture when the silver layer is porous or damaged.  This kind of corrosion is known as red plague.

Little  evidence exists for copper(I) hydroxide CuOH, which is expected to rapidly undergo dehydration.  A similar situation applies to the hydroxides of gold(I) and silver(I).

Properties
The solid is diamagnetic.  In terms of their coordination spheres, copper centres are 2-coordinated and the oxides are tetrahedral.  The structure thus resembles in some sense the main polymorphs of SiO2, and both structures feature interpenetrated lattices.

Copper(I) oxide dissolves in concentrated ammonia solution to form the colourless complex [Cu(NH3)2]+, which is easily oxidized in air to the blue [Cu(NH3)4(H2O)2]2+. Dilute sulfuric acid and nitric acid produce copper(II) sulfate and copper(II) nitrate, respectively.

Cu2O degrades to copper(II) oxide in moist air.

 Structure 
Cu2O crystallizes in a cubic structure with a lattice constant a''l = 4.2696 Å. The copper atoms arrange in a fcc sublattice, the oxygen atoms in a bcc sublattice. One sublattice is shifted by a quarter of the body diagonal. The space group is Pnm, which includes the point group with full octahedral symmetry.

Semiconducting properties
In the history of semiconductor physics, Cu2O is one of the most studied materials, and many experimental semiconductor applications have been demonstrated first in this material:
Semiconductor
Semiconductor diodes
Phonoritons ("a coherent superposition of exciton, photon, and phonon")
The lowest excitons in Cu2O are extremely long lived; absorption lineshapes have been demonstrated with neV linewidths, which is the narrowest bulk exciton resonance ever observed.  The associated quadrupole polaritons have low group velocity approaching the speed of sound. Thus, light moves almost as slowly as sound in this medium, which results in high polariton densities.
Another unusual feature of the ground state excitons is that all primary scattering mechanisms are known quantitatively. Cu2O was the first substance where an entirely parameter-free model of absorption linewidth broadening by temperature could be established, allowing the corresponding absorption coefficient to be deduced. It can be shown using Cu2O that the Kramers–Kronig relations do not apply to polaritons.

Applications
Cuprous oxide is commonly used as a pigment, a fungicide, and an antifouling agent for marine paints.  Rectifier diodes based on this material have been used industrially as early as 1924, long before silicon became the standard.  Copper(I) oxide is also responsible for the pink color in a positive Benedict's test.

In December 2021, Toshiba announced the creation of a transparent cuprous oxide (Cu2O) thin-film solar cell. The cell achieved an 8.4% energy conversion efficiency, the highest efficiency ever reported for any cell of this type as of 2021. The cells could be used for high-altitude platform station applications and electric vehicles.

Similar compounds
An example of natural copper(I,II) oxide is the mineral paramelaconite, Cu4O3 or CuCuO3.

See also
Copper(II) oxide

References

External links

National Pollutant Inventory: Copper and compounds fact sheet
Chemical Land21 Product Information page
 Make a solar cell in your kitchen
 A Flat Panel Solar Battery
 Copper oxides project page

Copper(I) compounds
Semiconductor materials
Solar cells
Transition metal oxides